Adam Blayne Schreiber (born February 20, 1962, Galveston, Texas, United States) is an American  former American football center and Long snapper who played 202 games over 16 seasons in the National Football League with seven different teams.

Schreiber is Jewish.  He attended S. R. Butler High School where he was a star on the varsity football team, graduating in 1980. He then went on to play college football at the University of Texas. He currently resides in Panama City Beach, Florida.

References 

1962 births
Living people
American football centers
Atlanta Falcons players
Jewish American sportspeople
Minnesota Vikings players
New Orleans Saints players
New York Giants players
New York Jets players
Philadelphia Eagles players
Seattle Seahawks players
Sportspeople from Huntsville, Alabama
Texas Longhorns football players
Sportspeople from Galveston, Texas
21st-century American Jews